Kodori range is a mountain range in the west Greater Caucasus, in the eastern border part of Abkhazia, Georgia.

Geography 
The longest and most branched ridge of Abkhazia. It is a southwestern spur of the Main Caucasian (or Dividing) ridge, from which the Dalari pass departs and east of the  peak (3985 m.). It stretches for almost 75 km from north-east to south-west. From the northwest it is delimited by the Sakeni river valley (beginning Kodori), from the southeast - by the Enguri valleys and its tributary Nenskra.

The ridge line has sharp ups and downs.

It is composed mainly of volcanic rocks, shale and sandstone.

On the slopes of the southern spurs there is surrounded by mountains, town Tkvarcheli.

See also 
Bzyb Range
Gagra Range

Notes

References 

Mountain ranges of Georgia (country)
Mountain ranges of Abkhazia
Mountain ranges of the Caucasus